Gaspard is a Francophone male given name or family name, and may refer to:

People

Given name
 Gaspard II Schetz, Lord of Grobbendonk
 Gaspard Abeille (1648–1718), French poet 
 Gaspard André (1840–1896), French architect 
 Gaspard Augé (born 1979), one half of French electronic music duo Justice
 Claude Gaspard Bachet de Méziriac (1581–1638), French mathematician 
 Gaspard Bauhin (1560–1624), Swiss botanist
 Gaspard Laurent Bayle (1774–1816), French physician
 Gaspard Bobek (1593–1635), Croatian Roman Catholic prelate 
 Gaspard Auguste Brullé (1809–1873), French entomologist
 Gaspard Jean-Baptiste Brunet (1734–1793), French military commander 
 Gaspard Bureau (died 1469), French ballistics expert and inventor
 Gaspard de Chabrol (1773–1843), French politician and government official
 Gaspard Adolphe Chatin (1813–1901), French physician, mycologist and botanist
 Pierre Gaspard Chaumette (1763–1794), French Revolutionary leader
 Gaspard I de Coligny (1465/1470–1522), French noble and military leader
 Gaspard II de Coligny (1519–1572), French Huguenot leader 
 Gaspard III de Coligny (1584–1646), French Huguenot military general
 Gaspard Corrette (c. 1671 – c. 1733), French composer and organist
 Gaspard-Gustave de Coriolis (1792–1843), French mathematician
 Gaspard Cuenot (born 1991), Swiss Nordic skier and a former biathlete
 Gaspard Duchange (1662–1757), French engraver
 Gaspard Dughet (1613–1675), French painter 
 Gaspard Fauteux (1898–1963), Canadian parliamentarian
 Gaspard Amédée Gardanne (1758–1807), French military general
 Gaspard Gourgaud (1783–1852), French military general
 Gaspard Goyrand (1803–1866), French surgeon and politician
 Gaspard de Gueidan (1688–1767), French aristocrat and lawyer
 Gaspard van der Heyden (c. 1496 – c. 1549), Dutch goldsmith, engraver, master printer and builder of astronomical instruments 
 Gaspard Lemaire (1899–1979), Belgian swimmer
 Gaspard Thémistocle Lestiboudois (1797–1876), French naturalist
 Gaspard Louis, Haitian dancer and choreographer
 Gaspard Manesse (born 1975), French actor and musician
 Gaspard Marsy (1624/1625–1681), of the brothers Gaspard and Balthazard Marsy, French sculptor
 Gaspard Mermillod (1824–1892), Swiss Roman Catholic cardinal and bishop 
 Gaspard Michaud (1795–1880), French malacologist
 Gaspard Théodore Mollien (1796–1872), French diplomat and explorer
 Gaspard Monge (1746–1818), French mathematician
 Gaspard Musabyimana (born 1955), Rwandan writer
 Gaspard Nemius (1587–1667), Roman Catholic bishop and archbishop
 Gaspard Pacaud (1859–1928), Canadian journalist and politician
 Gaspard de Prony (1755–1839), French mathematician and engineer
 Gaspard Rigaud (1661–1705), French painter and portraitist
 Gaspard Rinaldi (1909–1978), French cyclist
 Gaspard Robert (1722–1799), French ceramics manufacturer founder 
 Gaspard Le Roux (c. 1670 – c. 1706), French harpsichordist 
 Gaspard de Saulx (1509–1573), French military leader 
 Gaspard Terrasson (1680–1752), French oratorian and priest
 Gaspard-Félix Tournachon (also known as Nadar; 1820–1910), French photographer known as (Félix) Nadar
 Gaspard Ulliel (1984–2022), French actor and model
 Gaspard Vieusseux (1746–1814), Swiss physician

Surname
 Mitch Gaspard (born 1965), American college baseball coach
Patrick Gaspard (born 1967), president of the Center for American Progress (CAP)
 Pierre Gaspard (mountaineer) (1834–1915), French mountain climber and guide
 Pierre Gaspard (born 1959), Belgian physicist
 Shad Gaspard (1981–2020), professional wrestler and actor

Fiction 
 Gaspard (novel), 1915 French novel by René Benjamin which won the Prix Goncourt
 Gaspard and Lisa, protagonists in a series of children's books by Anne Gutman and Georg Hallensleben
 Gaspard and Lisa (TV series),  a British–American–French animated television series
 A supporting character in Charles Dickens' novel, A Tale of Two Cities
 Gaspard the Fox, a real urban fox whose fictional story is told in a picture book by Zeb Soanes and James Mayhew
 Grand Duke Gaspard de Chalons, a Dragon Age: Inquisition game character
 Gaspard, a character and boss in Dark Cloud 2

Other uses
 Gaspard, Saint-Jean-du-Sud, Haiti, a village in the Sud department of Haiti
 Gaspard de la nuit, piano suite (1908) by Maurice Ravel
 Pic Gaspard, a mountain in the French Alps
 Colonel Gaspard, the nom-de-guerre of French Resistance leader Émile Coulaudon (1907–1977)

French masculine given names